Szlama (diminutive Szlamek) is a Polish Yiddish male given name of Š-L-M.

Notable people with the name include:

 Szlama Ber Winer (1911–1942), Polish Jew from Izbica Kujawska, who escaped from the Chełmno extermination camp 
 Szlama Grzywacz (1909-1944), member of the French resistance

Polish masculine given names
Jewish masculine given names